Corey Hébert is a physician, journalist, and educator practicing in New Orleans, Louisiana and is the Chief Medical Correspondent for WWL-TV, the CBS Affiliate for New Orleans and the Gulf Coast. He was first and only Chief Medical Editor/Correspondent for Black News Channel (BNC) and the Chief Executive Officer of Community Health TV and College Health TV. Hebert was previously the on-air Chief Medical Editor for WDSU, the NBC television affiliate New Orleans and the Gulf Coast, and for Hearst-Argyle Broadcasting for over 17 years.  Hebert was also an on-air expert for the Dr. Oz show and www.DoctorOz.com for 11 years. He is an assistant professor in private practice at Louisiana State University Health Sciences Center and Tulane University, where he teaches and sees patients in all populations but focuses on healthy lifestyles, adolescent medicine,  medical nutrition, attention deficit disorder (ADHD) and post traumatic stress disorder as it relates to COVID-19. He is the former Chief Medical Officer for the New Orleans Public School District (NOPS) as well as the Medical Director of the Louisiana Recovery School District, which was the largest school district in the state during his tenure.  He is the Chief Medical Officer of Dillard University  Most recently Dr. Hebert was tapped to be the Chief Medical Officer of CareRx Inform, (www.carerxinform.com) a nationwide prescription service that provides discounted prescription prices and telemedicine for patients and their pets.

Early life
Hébert was born in Baton Rouge, Louisiana, on November 4, 1969, and was educated in the Baton Rouge area during his elementary and high school years.  He holds a Bachelor of Science degree from  Morehouse College in Atlanta, Georgia, and earned his medical degree from Meharry Medical College in Nashville, Tennessee. Upon graduation he did his internship and residency at Tulane University Medical Center and Charity Hospital of New Orleans. Hébert was chosen as Chief Resident of Pediatrics in 2000 at Tulane Medical Center which made him the first African American to hold that position in the history of that institution.

Career
Hébert has been featured on national broadcasts including The Oprah Winfrey Show, The Early Show with Harry Smith on CBS, CNN, NBC Nightly News with Brian Williams, The Huffington Post, Good Morning America, The Today Show and the National Geographic Channel, Current TV, Aljazeera America, Countdown with Keith Olbermann, Dr. Nancy and is regularly featured on The Meredith Viera Show,  MSNBC's The Ed Show and AM Joy with Joy Reid.  He was featured in the Spike Lee feature film When the Levees Broke. He hosts a weekly radio show on the Cumulus Broadcasting Network titled Doctor for the People which has an interactive platform for Hébert to connect with urban communities. He is a contributor to the  Discovery Channel television show How Stuff Works and a frequent contributor to the Dr. Oz show. Hébert is a medical consultant for Glaxo Smith Kline, Novartis, Mead Johnson, Chevron, Essence Magazine, charitable organizations and churches throughout the United States. Hébert is the Chief Executive Officer of College Health TV, the largest provider of health information on college campuses in the United States. Hébert is the Chief Medical Editor of  Ebony Communications.

Hébert is featured on Netflix in the first full-length documentary about ADHD entitled Take Your Pills, produced by Maria Shriver and directed by Alison Klayman. It premiered at the SXSW festival in March 2018.

He testified before the United States Congress on April 28, 2010, on the safety of Federal Emergency Management Agency trailers in a hearing entitled "Public Sales of Hurricane Katrina/Rita FEMA Trailers: Are they Safe or Environmental Time Bombs?"

Hebert was recently tapped by Louisiana Governor John Bel Edwards to serve as an Executive Committee appointee for the Louisiana Health Equity Task Force. This board was formed in response to the increasing mortality of African Americans due to COVID-19 and the health inequities that exist for minorities in the state.

Hebert is a clinical researcher, having been the principal investigator on over 50 FDA regulated clinical trials and he is licensed to practice medicine in the State of Louisiana by the Louisiana State Board of Medical Examiners. He lives in New Orleans, and he has two children.

References

External links
 
 Old School 106.7 - HEARD IT ON THE AIR - VIDEO
 Dr. Corey Hebert Testifies Before Congress On Safety Of FEMA Trailers
 theadvocate.com | The Advocate | Baton Rouge News, Sports and Entertainment
 Herald Home
 OBAMACARE MADE SIMPLE(R)! | Black Health TV – Health Information, Videos and Support Groups
 Medical Editor Corey J. Hebert, MD | News Team - WDSU Home
 Essence Music Festival 2010
 WDSU-TV's Dr. Corey Hebert nominated for GQ Man of the Year honor | NOLA.com
 Home

Morehouse College alumni
Meharry Medical College alumni
Tulane University faculty
Year of birth missing (living people)
Living people
American male journalists
American chief executives in the media industry